The Armistice of Cassibile was an armistice that was signed on 3 September 1943 between the Kingdom of Italy and the Allies during World War II. It was made public five days later.

It was signed by Major General Walter Bedell Smith for the Allies and Brigade General Giuseppe Castellano for Italy at a conference of generals from both sides in an Allied military camp at Cassibile, in Sicily, which had recently been occupied by the Allies. The armistice was approved by both Italian King Victor Emmanuel III and Marshal Badoglio, who was the Prime Minister of Italy at the time.

Germany moved rapidly by attacking Italian forces in Italy (8–19 September), southern France and the Balkans, and freeing Benito Mussolini (12 September). The Italian forces were quickly defeated, and most of Italy was occupied by German troops, who established a puppet state, the Italian Social Republic. The king, the Italian government, and most of the Navy escaped to territories occupied by the Allies.

Background

After the surrender of the Axis powers in North Africa on 13 May 1943, the Allies bombed Rome on 16 May, invaded Sicily on 10 July and prepared to land on the Italian mainland.

In the spring of 1943, preoccupied with the disastrous situation of the Italian military during the war, the Italian dictator, Benito Mussolini, removed several figures from the government whom he considered to be more loyal to King Victor Emmanuel III than to the Fascist regime. 

To help the execution of his plan, the King asked for the assistance of Dino Grandi (1st Count of Mordano), one of the leading members of the Fascist hierarchy who, in his younger years, had been considered the sole credible alternative to Mussolini as leader of the National Fascist Party. The King was also motivated by the suspicion that the Count of Mordano's ideas about Fascism might be changed abruptly. Various ambassadors, including Pietro Badoglio himself, proposed the vague possibility of succeeding Mussolini as dictator.

The secret rebels later involved Giuseppe Bottai, another high member of the Fascist Directorate and Minister of Culture, and Galeazzo Ciano (the 2nd Count of Cortellazzo and Buccari), the second most powerful man in the Fascist Party and Mussolini's son-in-law. The conspirators devised an "Order of the Day" for the next meeting of the Grand Council of Fascism (Gran Consiglio del Fascismo), which contained a proposal to restore direct control of politics to the King. After the Council, held on 25 July 1943, a majority vote adopted the "order of the day", and Mussolini was then summoned to meet the King and dismissed as prime minister. Upon leaving the meeting, Mussolini was arrested by carabinieri and spirited off to the island of Ponza. Badoglio became President of the Council of Ministers (Prime Minister). However, Grandi had been told that another general of more significant personal and professional qualities (Marshal Enrico Caviglia) would have taken the position.

The appointment of Badoglio did not change the position of Italy as Germany's ally in the war. However, many channels sought a peace treaty with the Allies. Meanwhile, Adolf Hitler sent several divisions south of the Alps, officially to help defend Italy from Allied landings but really to control the country.

Three Italian generals (including Brigade General Giuseppe Castellano) were separately sent to Lisbon to contact Allied diplomats. However, to open the proceedings, the Allies had to determine who was the most authoritative envoy, and the three generals had started to quarrel about who had the highest authority. In the end, Castellano was admitted to speak with the Allies to set the conditions for the surrender of Italy. Among the representatives of the Allies were the British Ambassador to Portugal, Sir Ronald Hugh Campbell, and two generals sent by Dwight Eisenhower: the American Walter Bedell Smith (Eisenhower's chief of staff) and the British Kenneth Strong (assistant chief of staff for intelligence).

On 27 August, General Castellano returned to Italy and, three days later, briefed Badoglio about the Allied request for a meeting to be held in Sicily, which had been suggested by the British Ambassador to the Vatican.

To ease communication between the Allies and the Italian government, a captured British Special Operations Executive (SOE) agent, Dick Mallaby, was released from Verona Prison and secretly moved to the Quirinale. It was vital for the Germans to remain ignorant of any suggestion of Italian surrender, and the SOE was the most secure method under the circumstances.

Terms
Badoglio still considered it possible to gain favorable conditions in exchange for the surrender. He ordered Castellano to insist that any surrender of Italy be conditioned on a landing of Allied troops on the Italian mainland. The Allies held only Sicily and some minor islands.

On 31 August, Brigade General Castellano reached Termini Imerese, in Sicily, by plane and was transferred to Cassibile, a town near Syracuse. It soon became evident that the two sides in the negotiations had adopted somewhat distant positions. Castellano pressed the request for the Italian territory to be defended from the inevitable reaction of the German Wehrmacht against Italy after the signing. In return, he received only vague promises, including launching a parachute division over Rome. Moreover, the actions were to be conducted contemporaneously with the signing, not to precede it, as the Italians had wanted.

The following day, Castellano was received by Badoglio and his entourage. Italy's Foreign Minister, Raffaele Guariglia, declared that the Allied conditions were to be accepted. Other generals, such as Giacomo Carboni, maintained that the Army Corps deployed around Rome was insufficient to protect the city because of the lack of fuel and ammunition and that the armistice had to be postponed. Badoglio did not pronounce himself in the meeting. In the afternoon, he appeared before the King, who decided to accept the armistice conditions.

Signing

A confirmation telegram was sent to the Allies. The message, however, was intercepted by the Wehrmacht, the German armed forces, which had long since begun to suspect that Italy was seeking a separate armistice. The Germans contacted Badoglio, who repeatedly confirmed the unwavering loyalty of Italy to its German ally. The Germans doubted his reassurances, and the Wehrmacht started to devise an effective plan, Operation Achse, to take control of Italy as soon as the Italian government had switched allegiance to the Allies.

On 2 September, Castellano set off again to Cassibile with an order to confirm the acceptance of the Allied conditions. He had no written authorization from the head of the Italian government, which wanted to dissociate himself as much as possible from the forthcoming defeat of his country.

The signing ceremony began at 14:00 on 3 September. Castellano and Bedell Smith signed the accepted text on behalf of Badoglio and General Eisenhower, respectively. A bombing mission on Rome by 500 airplanes was stopped at the last moment and had been Eisenhower's inducement to accelerate the procedure of the armistice. Harold Macmillan, the British government's representative minister at the Allied Staff, informed Winston Churchill that the armistice had been signed "without amendments of any kind".

Aftermath
Only after the signing had taken place was Castellano informed of the additional clauses, which General Campbell had presented to another Italian general, Zanussi, who had also been in Cassibile since 31 August. Zanussi, for unclear reasons, had not informed Castellano about them. Nevertheless, Bedell Smith explained to Castellano that the other conditions would have taken effect only if Italy had not taken on a fighting role in the war alongside the Allies.

On the afternoon of the same day, Badoglio had a briefing with the senior commanders of the Regia Marina (Italy's Royal Navy) and the Regia Aeronautica (Italy's Royal Air Force), with the War Ministers and with the King's representatives. However, he omitted any mention of the signing of the armistice and referred only to ongoing negotiations.

The day of entry into force of the armistice was linked to a planned landing in central Italy and was left to the Allies' discretion. Castellano still understood that the date was intended to be 12 September, and Badoglio started to move troops to Rome.

On 7 September, a small Allied delegation reached Rome to inform Badoglio that the next day would have been the day of the armistice. He was also informed about the pending arrival of the American 82nd Airborne Division into airports around the city. Badoglio told the delegation that his army was not ready to support the landing and that most airports in the area were under German control. He asked for a deferral of the armistice of a few days. When General Eisenhower learned that, the landing in Rome of American troops was canceled, but the day of the armistice was confirmed since other troops were already en route by sea to land in southern Italy.

When the armistice was announced by Allied radio on the afternoon of 8 September, German forces immediately attacked Italian forces by executing Operation Achse. Most of the Regio Esercito (Italian Royal Army) had not been informed about the armistice, and no clear orders had been issued about the line of conduct to be taken in the face of the German armed forces. Some Italian divisions that should have defended Rome were still in transit from southern France. The king, along with the royal family and Badoglio, fled Rome on the early morning of the 9th and took shelter in Brindisi, in southern Italy. Their initial intention was to move army headquarters out of Rome with the King and the Prime Minister, but few staff officers reached Brindisi. Meanwhile, the Italian troops, without instructions, collapsed and were soon overwhelmed. Some small units decided to stay loyal to the German ally. From 8 to 12 September, the German forces occupied all of the Italian territory that was still not under Allied control, except Sardinia and part of Apulia, without meeting organized resistance. In Rome, an Italian governor, with the support of an Italian infantry division, nominally ruled the city until 23 September, but in practice, the city was under German control from 11 September.

On 3 September, British and Canadian troops crossed the Strait of Messina and began landing in the southernmost tip of Calabria during Operation Baytown. The day after the armistice had been made public, 9 September, the Allies made landings at at Salerno and at at Taranto.

The Allies failed to take full advantage of the Italian armistice and were quickly checked by German troops. In terrain that favored defense, the Allied forces took 20 months to reach the northern borders of Italy.

Some of the Italian troops based outside Italy, in the occupied Balkans and Greek islands, held out some weeks after the armistice. Still, without any determined support from the Allies, all had been overwhelmed by the Germans by the end of September 1943. On the island of Cephalonia, the Italian Acqui Division was massacred after it had resisted German forces. A similar fate awaited 103 Italian officers of the 50th Infantry Division Regina on the island of Kos, who were shot in early October 1943 after the Germans captured the island. Only on the islands of Leros and Samos, with British reinforcements, would the resistance last until November 1943, and in Corsica, Italian troops forced the German troops to leave the island.

In other cases, individual Italian units, mostly more minor, remained loyal to the Axis powers. Many of the units formed the nucleus of the armed forces of the puppet Italian Social Republic.

Following the September 1943 Armistice, Romania became the second Axis Power in Europe.

Regia Marina
Both the Regio Esercito (Italian Royal Army) and the Regia Aeronautica (Italian Royal Air Force) virtually disintegrated with the announcement of the armistice on 8 September. There was a danger that some of the Navy might fight on, be scuttled, or (most concerningly for the Allies) end up in German hands. As such, the truce called for Italian warships on Italy's west coast, mostly at La Spezia and Genoa, to sail for North Africa and to pass Corsica and Sardinia and for those at Taranto, in the heel of Italy, to sail for Malta.

At 02:30, on 9 September, the three battleships Roma, Vittorio Veneto, and Italia "shoved off from La Spezia escorted by three light cruisers and eight destroyers". When German troops, who had stormed into the town to prevent the defection, became enraged by the ships' escape, "they rounded up and summarily shot several Italian captains who, unable to get their vessels underway, had scuttled them". That afternoon, German bombers attacked the ships by sailing without air cover off Sardinia and launching guided bombs. Several ships suffered damage, and Roma sank with the loss of nearly 1,400 men. Most of the remaining ships made it safely to North Africa "while three destroyers and a cruiser which had stopped to rescue survivors, docked in Menorca".

The Navy's turnover proceeded more smoothly in other areas of Italy. When an Allied naval force headed for the large naval base of Taranto, it watched a flotilla of Italian ships sailing out of Taranto Harbour towards their surrender at Malta.

An agreement between the Allies and the Italians in late September provided for some of the Navy to be kept in commission; however, the battleships were to be reduced to care and maintenance and effectively disarmed. Italian mercantile marine vessels were to operate under the same general conditions as the Allies'. In all cases, the Italian vessels would retain their Italian crews and fly Italian flags.

See also
 Military history of Italy during World War II
 Allied invasion of Italy
 European Theatre of World War II
 Italian Co-belligerent Army
 Operation Margarethe
 Operation Panzerfaust
 1944 Romanian coup d'état
 1944 Bulgarian coup d'état
 Moscow Armistice
 Italian Army in Russia
 Badoglio Proclamation
 Treaty of Peace with Italy, 1947

References

Sources

External links
  Il diario del generale Giuseppe Castellano, La Sicilia, 8 settembre 2003
  8 Settembre 1943, l'armistizio Centro Studi della Resistenza dell'Anpi di Roma
 The Avalon Project at Yale Law School: Terms of the Armistice with Italy; September 3, 1943

20th century in Italy
Politics of World War II
Cassibile
Italian campaign (World War II)
1943 in Italy
World War II treaties
Peace treaties of Italy
Peace treaties of the United States
Peace treaties of France
Peace treaties of the United Kingdom
History of Syracuse, Sicily

Treaties concluded in 1943
Treaties entered into force in 1943
Treaties of the Kingdom of Italy (1861–1946)
Italy–United States relations
Peace treaties of the Soviet Union
September 1943 events